David John Blackman is a British archaeologist specialising in ancient maritime history. He was a founder of the Committee for Nautical Archaeology in 1964, and was its Chair from 1975 to 1976. He served as Director of the British School at Athens between 1996 and 2002. He is currently a Senior Research Fellow at the Centre for the Study of Ancient Documents, University of Oxford.

Works

References

British archaeologists
Maritime archaeology
British maritime historians
Living people
Academics of the University of Oxford
Directors of the British School at Athens
Year of birth missing (living people)